La Julia is a sector of the city of Santo Domingo in the Distrito Nacional of the Dominican Republic.  particularly populated by upper class people, for example the current president of the Dominican Republic "Luis Abinader" resides in this sector.

Sources 
Distrito Nacional sectors

Populated places in Santo Domingo